McGahee is a surname. Notable people with the surname include:

Casey McGahee (born 1983), Canadian football player
Willis McGahee (born 1981), American football player

See also
McGahey
McGhee